Broyles is a surname. Notable people with the surname include:

Chuck Broyles (born 1947), American football player and college football head coach
Dwayne Broyles (born 1982), American basketball player
Emma Broyles (born 2001), Miss America 2022
Frank Broyles (born 1924), American football player and college football head coach
Paul W. Broyles (1896-1974), American businessman and politician
Ryan Broyles (born 1988), American football player
William Broyles Jr. (born 1944), American screenwriter

See also
Broyles-Darwin House, a historic house in Dayton, Tennessee, U.S.
Broyles Award, an American college football award